Malignant ulcer may refer to:

 Carcinomatous ulcer, an ulcer with cancerous pathology behind it
 Rodent ulcer, also known as basal cell carcinoma
 Melanotic ulcer
 A historical term for necrotizing fasciitis